State Road 203 (NM 203) is a  state highway in the US state of New Mexico. NM 203's western terminus is at County Route 3 (CR 3) at the De Baca/ Guadalupe county line west-northwest of Lake Sumner, and the eastern terminus is at U.S. Route 84 (US 84) north of Fort Sumner.

Major intersections

See also

References

203
Transportation in De Baca County, New Mexico